Spokane Public Schools (District No. 81) is a public school district in Spokane County, Washington, and serves the city of Spokane. The district includes oversight and administration of seven high schools, six middle schools, and 34 elementary schools. Specialized programming focuses on alternative learning opportunities for intelligently gifted children, as well as those that experience moderate to severe emotional and/or physical disabilities, are homeless, or experiencing the Spokane Public Schools system through the Foreign Exchange Program.

Demographics 
In 2012 the largest groups of students who spoke languages other than English were Russian (530), Marshallese (370), and Spanish (360)-speakers, respectively. In 2006 the school district began receiving large numbers of ethnic Marshallese. The school system created the Marshallese 101 outreach and training program to combat truancy and address issues related to frequent address changes, staying with extended family, and other issues related to Marshallese culture.

Schools

High schools
 Joel E. Ferris High School
 Lewis and Clark High School
 North Central High School
 John R. Rogers High School
 Shadle Park High School
 NEWTech Skills Center
 The Community School
 On Track Academy

Middle schools
 The Libby Center
 Chase Middle School
 Garry Middle School
 Glover Middle School
 Sacajawea Middle School
 Salk Middle School
 Shaw Middle School
 Yasuhara Middle School
 Flett Middle School

Elementary schools
 Adams Elementary School
 Arlington Elementary School
 Audubon Elementary School
 Balboa Elementary School
 Bemiss Elementary School
 Browne Elementary School
 Cooper Elementary School
 Finch Elementary School
 Frances Scott Elementary School (formerly Sheridan Elementary School)
 Franklin Elementary School
 Garfield Elementary School
 Grant Elementary School
 Hamblen Elementary School
 Holmes Elementary School
 Hutton Elementary School
 Indian Trail Elementary School
 Jefferson Elementary School
 Libby Center Elementary School
 Lidgerwood Elementary School
 Lincoln Heights Elementary School
 Linwood Elementary School
 Logan Elementary School
 Longfellow Elementary School
 Madison Elementary School
 Moran Prairie Elementary School
 Mullan Road Elementary School
 Regal Elementary School
 Ridgeview Elementary School
 Roosevelt Elementary School
 Stevens Elementary School
 Westview Elementary School
 Whitman Elementary School
 Willard Elementary School
 Wilson Elementary School
 Woodridge Elementary School

Special programs
 APPLE
 Career and Technical Education (CTE)
 Childcare: Express
 Early Learning (Preschool)
 English Language Development (ELD)
 Envision program: Community Service
 Family Connections
 HEART – Homeless Education and Resource Team
 IMAGES
 Junior ROTC
 LAP
 Spokane Public Montessori
 Spanish Immersion Program K-8 (currently only K-3rd grade)
 Oddessy Program
 Special education
 Spokane Virtual Learning
 SPRINT (7–8 Parent Participation)
 Tessera Program
 The Enrichment Cooperative (TEC)
 Title 1
 Work Study Program

See also

Education in Spokane, Washington

References

External links
 
 Spokane School District Report Card

 
School districts in Washington (state)
Public school districts in Spokane County, Washington
School districts established in 1889
1889 establishments in Washington (state)
Education in Spokane, Washington